William Henry Johnson   (15 October 1890 – 25 April 1945) was an English recipient of the Victoria Cross, the highest and most prestigious award for gallantry in the face of the enemy that can be awarded to British and Commonwealth forces.

He was 27 years old, and on 3 October 1918 at Ramicourt, France, he performed the gallant act, for which he was awarded the Victoria Cross.

Details
Johnston was a sergeant in 1/5th Battalion, The Sherwood Foresters (The Nottinghamshire and Derbyshire Regiment), British Army during the First World War.

His VC was gazetted on 14 December 1918 with the following citation:

He was also awarded the French Médaille militaire.

He was in the Home Guard during World War II, but had to resign due to ill-health.

The medal
His Victoria Cross is displayed at the Sherwood Foresters Museum, Nottingham Castle, England.

References

Monuments to Courage (David Harvey, 1999)
The Register of the Victoria Cross (This England, 1997)
VCs of the First World War - The Final Days 1918 (Gerald Gliddon, 2000)

Further reading
 Major R. E. Priestley, Breaking the Hindenburg Line: The Story of the 46th Division, London: T.F. Unwin, 1919  (at archive.org)

Citation links
Location of grave and VC medal (Nottinghamshire)
The Victoria Cross Awards to the Sherwood Foresters (photos, site includes other articles on SF)

1890 births
1945 deaths
People from Worksop
Sherwood Foresters soldiers
British World War I recipients of the Victoria Cross
British Army personnel of World War I
British Home Guard soldiers
British Army recipients of the Victoria Cross
Military personnel from Nottinghamshire